Oliver Rutledge Hudson (born September 7, 1976) is an American actor. He is known for his roles as Adam Rhodes in the CBS comedy series Rules of Engagement (2007–2013), Jeff Fordham on the ABC musical drama series Nashville (2013–2015) and Wes Gardner in the Fox horror comedy Scream Queens. He appeared as one of the main cast members of the ABC sitcom Splitting Up Together, produced by Ellen DeGeneres. In 2022, he played FBI agent Garrett Miller in Fox's The Cleaning Lady.

Early life
Hudson was born in Los Angeles to Academy Award-winning actress Goldie Hawn and musician Bill Hudson. After his parents divorced in 1980, he and his sister, actress Kate Hudson, were raised in Colorado by their mother and her partner, actor Kurt Russell. He has four half-siblings: Emily and Zachary, from his biological father's marriage to actress Cindy Williams; Lalania, from another of his father's relationships in 2006; and Wyatt, from his mother's relationship with Kurt Russell.

Hudson is of Italian descent via his father; English and German descent through his maternal grandfather, and Hungarian Jewish descent through his maternal grandmother. He was raised in the Jewish faith.

Career
Hudson appeared opposite his mother in the 1999 comedy film The Out-of-Towners and later starred in several teen movies, such as The Smokers and Going Greek. In 2002, he played the lead role of The WB comedy series My Guide to Becoming a Rock Star. Hudson also appeared in a recurring role opposite Katie Holmes as her love interest, Eddie Doling, in sixteen episodes of Dawson's Creek from 2002 to 2003.

Hudson starred in The WB series The Mountain from 2004 to 2005; the show was canceled after 13 episodes. In 2006, he starred in horror films The Breed and Black Christmas. He also starred with Claire Forlani in the Lifetime movie Carolina Moon in 2007. From 2007 to 2013, Hudson starred as Adam Rhodes in the CBS sitcom Rules of Engagement (2007–2013). In 2013, Hudson was cast in the recurring role of Jeff Fordham for the second season on the ABC drama series Nashville. Hudson later was promoted to series regular for the third season.

In 2015, Hudson was cast as a series regular on the horror comedy anthology series Scream Queens playing Wes Gardner, the father of a college sorority pledge member.  Also in 2015, Hudson and his sister, Kate Hudson, launched FL2, a men's activewear line and subsidiary of Fabletics. In 2017, Hudson was cast in the lead role of Martin in the ABC sitcom Splitting Up Together which premiered in 2018. The series was cancelled after two seasons.

On September 22, 2019, he became the first panelist to win the Doris Award on the ABC version of To Tell the Truth. Through 2022, he starred as FBI agent Garrett Miller, in the first two seasons of Fox's The Cleaning Lady.

Hudson will play in the lead role of Will in the CBS comedy pilot The Three of Us which was created by Frank Pines. The release date has not yet been announced. More recently, he was attached to developing Worlds Best Dad via Jupiter Entertainment, after signing a first look deal with his production company Bronco Productions.

Personal life
Hudson married actress Erinn Bartlett on June 9, 2006, in Cabo San Lucas, Mexico. The couple have three children: two sons, Wilder Brooks (born August 23, 2007) and Bodhi Hawn (born March 19, 2010), and a daughter, Rio Laura (born July 18, 2013).

Filmography

Film

Television

References

External links
 
 

1976 births
20th-century American male actors
21st-century American male actors
American male film actors
American male television actors
American male voice actors
American people of Hungarian-Jewish descent
American people of Italian descent
American people of English descent
American people of German descent
Crossroads School alumni
Hudson family (show business)
Living people
Jewish American male actors
Male actors from Los Angeles
21st-century American Jews